Bidun Dar or Bid Andar may refer to:
 Bid Andar, Shahr-e Babak